Eastman Institute for Oral Health of University of Rochester is a school of dentistry located at the University of Rochester Medical Center in Rochester, New York, United States. Unlike other dental schools in the United States, it does not have an undergraduate dental program. It is affiliated with Strong Memorial Hospital.

The institution records over 180,000 patient visits a year and receives over $9 million in research funding as a location for oral health research in North America. Its programs receive over 1,200 applications every year for 40 positions, resulting in an acceptance rate of 3.3%. In 2011, it underwent a $5.9 million renovation. The school has ranked within the top 10 of National Institutes of Health (NIH)/National Institute of Dental and Craniofacial Research (NIDCR) research funding to dental institutions several times, including ranking seventh in 2020. In the year 2020, the Eastman Institute for Oral Health published over 150 peer-reviewed research publications.

History
In 1928, the University of Rochester Medical Center created the first oral biology research center in the US. The center grew into the Department of Dental Research in the School of Medicine and Dentistry.

Programs and Specialties
University of Rochester Eastman Institute for Oral Health includes the following programs:

Oral and Maxillofacial Surgery
Orthodontics and Dentofacial Orthopedics
Pediatric Dentistry
Prosthodontics
Periodontics
Dental Public Health (DPH)
General Practice Residency (GPR)
Advanced Education in General Dentistry (AEGD)

Notable work
In 1955, Dr. Michael Buonocore developed the foundations of bonding and adhesive dentistry with the "acid etch technique." Dr. Buonocore and colleagues published the first paper on the application of sealants to pits and fissures of developing adult teeth, today a widely used technique for caries prevention.

As an early pioneer, in 1984 the Eastman Institute for Oral Health was selected by Per-Ingvar Brånemark as one of the few US dental institutions to conduct trials on dental implants. 

In 2016, the Eastman Institute for Oral Health was awarded the Gies Award for Achievement, Academic Dental Institution by the American Dental Education Association. The school has a Collaborative School-Based Dental Program that reaches over 10,000 underserved or underinsured children annually.

Accreditation
University of Rochester Eastman Institute for Oral Health is accredited by the Commission on Dental Accreditation (CODA) of the  American Dental Association (ADA).

See also
University of Rochester Medical Center
Strong Memorial Hospital
Eastman Dental Dispensary

References

Dental schools in New York (state)
University of Rochester
Educational institutions established in 1920
1920 establishments in New York (state)